Cola letestui is a species of flowering plant in the family Malvaceae. It is found only in Gabon.

References

letestui
Endemic flora of Gabon
Vulnerable flora of Africa
Taxonomy articles created by Polbot
Taxa named by François Pellegrin
Taxobox binomials not recognized by IUCN